Gotthard Sachsenberg (1891-1961) was a German First World War fighter ace credited with 31 confirmed aerial victories. Flying as commander of Marine Feld-Jaeger I, he led his naval aviators over the English Channel as a German counterpart to the Royal Naval Air Service.

List of victories

His victories are reported in chronological order, which is not necessarily the order or dates the victories were confirmed by headquarters.

This list is complete for entries, though obviously not for all details. Background data was abstracted from Above the Lines: The Aces and Fighter Units of the German Air Service, Naval Air Service and Flanders Marine Corps, 1914–1918, pp. 195–196, and The Aerodrome webpage on Gotthard Sachsenberg . Abbreviations were expanded by the editor creating this list.

References

Aerial victories of Sachsenberg, Gotthard
Sachsenberg, Gotthard